Atlético Madrid or full name Club Atlético de Madrid, S.A.D. (meaning "Athletic Club of Madrid"), commonly referred to as Atlético de Madrid in English or simply as Atlético, Atléti, or Atleti, is a Spanish professional football club based in Madrid, that play in La Liga.

Atletico Madrid may also refer to:
Atlético Madrid B, Spanish football team based in Madrid, in the community of Madrid, founded 1963, the reserve team of Atlético Madrid and currently plays in Segunda División B – Group 1with home games at Cerro del Espino Stadium 
Atlético Madrid C, earlier Spanish football club that played in the Tercera División and played their home games at the Nuevo Cerro del Espino
Atletico Madrid Balonmano, or BM Neptuno, or merger of Club Balonmano Neptuno/Atlético Madrid, earlier Spanish handball team based in Madrid, Spain (2011 to 2013)
Atlético Madrid BM, earlier Spanish handball team that was part of the Atlético sports organization (1951 to 1994)
Atlético Madrid Femenino, Spanish women's football team based in Madrid
Atlético Madrid Rugby, Spanish rugby union section of the Spanish club Atlético Madrid. Established in 1914
Atlético Madrid (youth), or Atlético de Madrid Juvenil, the under-19 team of Spanish professional football club Atlético Madrid